Sydney United Sports Centre, formerly known as Sydney Croatia Sports Centre and King Tomislav Park is a multi-use stadium in Edensor Park, Sydney, Australia.  It is mainly used for football and is the home ground for the Sydney United 58. The stadium has a capacity of 12,000 people and was built in 1979 and upgraded in 1998.

Gallery

References

External links
Official Website of Sydney United FC
World Football Organization page

Soccer venues in Sydney
Sports venues in Sydney
Sydney United 58 FC
Sports venues completed in 1979
A-League Women stadiums
Sydney FC (A-League Women)
1979 establishments in Australia